Komandorsky Nature Reserve is a zapovednik (nature reserve) located on the Commander Islands, Kamchatka Krai, Russia.

The total area of the preserve is 3,648,679 ha (36,486.79 km2) of which 2,177,398 ha (21,774 km2) are marine buffer zone. The land territory includes most of Bering Island, all of Medny Island, as well as thirteen smaller islands and rocks. It was created in 1993 to protect the diverse ecosystems of the Commander Islands and the surrounding marine waters of the Bering Sea and northern Pacific Ocean.

Because of its isolation and the high productivity of the Bering Sea and the Pacific continental shelf, the reserve is marked by a great diversity of animal life. It is a refuge for over a million seabirds, several hundred thousand northern fur seals, several thousand Steller's sea lions, common seals, and spotted seals, a healthy population of sea otter, some 21 whale species, two rare endemic subspecies of Arctic fox, and many endangered or threatened migratory birds, such as the whooper swan, Steller's eider, and Steller's sea eagle. Furthermore, it is biogeographically unique stepping stone between Asian and North American flora and fauna.

Fishing is entirely prohibited within the  buffer zone surrounding the preserve. 

An additional stated purpose of the preserve is to foster the ecologically and culturally sustainable development of the only inhabited settlement on the Commander Islands, the village of Nikolskoye (pop. approximately 750 as of 2007).

The site is being prepared for inscription to the World Heritage List.

External links
Detailed description of Komandorsky Zapovednik (Komandorsky Nature Reserve)
UNESCO.org: 1997 list of tentative WHSites

Nature reserves in Russia
Commander Islands
Geography of Kamchatka Krai
Protected areas of the Russian Far East
Zapovednik
1993 establishments in Russia
Protected areas established in 1993